Codex Marcianus GR. Z. 228 (=406) contains a partial manuscript of the treatise On the Soul by Aristotle. It is designated by symbol Oc. Paleographically, it has been assigned to the 14th century. It is written in Greek minuscule letters. The manuscript contains the incomplete text of the treatise. The text of Book II ends at 419 a 27. It has not Book III of the treatise. The codex includes commentary on the treatise by Simplicius of Cilicia and Sophonias and paraphrases by Themistius (fourteenth century).

The text of the manuscript represents the textual family κ.

The manuscript was not cited by Tiendelenburg, Torstrik, Biehl, Apelt, and Ross in his critical editions of the treatise On the Soul. It means the manuscript does not have high value.

The codex also has commentary by Pseudo-Diadochus on Plato's Timaeus, commentary by Simplicius of Cilicia on Aristotle's On the Heavens, commentary by Ammonius Hermiae’s on Plato's Phaedrus, and commentary by Proclus on Plato's Parmenides.

Currently, it is housed at the Biblioteca Marciana (BNM Gr. Z. 228 (=406)) in Venice.

See also 

 Codex Vindobonensis Philos. 75
 Codex Vindobonensis Philos. 157

Notes and references

Further reading 

 Paweł Siwek, Aristotelis tractatus De anima graece et latine, Desclée, Romae 1965.

External links
 BNM Gr. Z. 228 (=406) on-line

14th-century manuscripts
Aristotelian manuscripts